The 1995 Red and White Challenge was a non-ranking invitational snooker tournament held by the WPBSA, which took place in August 1995.
The tournament was played in Islamabad, Pakistan, and featured four professional players - Nigel Bond, John Parrott, Ken Doherty and David Roe - alongside four amateurs - Pakistan's Mohammed Yousuf and Naveen Perwani, Afghanistan's Saleh Mohammadi, and Farhan Mirza of Sweden.

Bond won the tournament, beating Parrott 8–6 in the final. All of the amateur players lost their opening matches.

Main draw

References

Snooker non-ranking competitions
Snooker competitions in England
1995 in snooker
1995 in English sport